Chondhi is a small village in the Alibag subdistrict of the Raigad district in Maharashtra, India.  It is located to the north of Alibag on Alibag-Rewas Road. Chondhi acts as a major market area for the neighboring villages. Nearby attractions include Kihim Beach and Kankeshwar. The language spoken here is Marathi.

Economy

Retail business is the mainstay of Chondhi. Several departmental stores and pharmacies are located here. Chondhi is also popular among the locals for its fish and vegetable market. Few average quality restaurants are located in Chondhi. The village is dotted with several Banks and ATMs

Administration

Chondhi forms part 
of the Group Gram Panchayat in Kihim.

Transport

 Road: Chondhi is well connected to Alibag (approximately 9 km) by road. MSRTC buses running on the Alibag - Rewas route are available throughout the day. Buses running on Alibag-Kihim and Alibag-Saswane also pass through Chondhi, but the frequency is less as compared to Alibag-Rewas route buses. Auto Rickshaws are readily available everywhere for local travel, but the fares are not regulated. It is a common practice to decide the fare before hand to avoid bargaining later. One has to travel through Chondhi to reach Kihim Beach.
 Railways: The nearest railway station is at Pen, which is approximately 30 km away.
 Ferry: Passenger boat services are available from Mandwa Jetty to Gateway of India and from Rewas to Bhaucha Dhakka in Mumbai throughout the year, except for Monsoon.

References

Villages in Raigad district